Vayala is a village located in the Meenachil (Pala) Taluk of Kottayam district, Kerala, India.  It is approximately 5 kilometers from the village Kuravilangad, about 11 kilometers from Pala municipality town and about 24 kilometers away from district capital Kottayam.

History 
It is believed that the name Vayala is derived from the Malayalam word vayal meaning "paddy field".

Transportation network 

Vayala is connected with the district headquarters Kottayam and other major cities. Public transport in the town is largely dependent on buses, run by private operators.

Schools
 Govt:V H S S Vayala

Churches & temples 

Vayala is located 10 km from Ettumanoor town and 6 km from Kuravilangdu Town. Vayala has four Hindu temples (Paruthurthikavu, Njaralappuzha Sree Dharma Sastha Temple, Thrikkayil Sree Subrahmanya Swami Temple, SNDP Balasubrahmaanya kshetram) and a Roman Catholic church Syrian church (St. George Church, Vayala), a Catholic Latin church (St. Marys Church, Vayala-Puthenangady), three Catholic Syrian chapels: St Joseph (Puthenangady, Vayala), St Xavier (Saviour Giri, Vayala), St Sebastian chapel (Thuruthimukku, Vayala), and a Sacred Heart Convent.

Hospitals 

Sacred Heart Catholic Nuns operated St. George Mount Hospital, is the only Allopathic Hospital Facility available with Vayala. Also Vayala has a Govt. Veterinary Hospital, Govt. Ayurvedic Hospital and two private operated Ayurvedic Hospitals (Vedasudha and Omsree).

Neighbouring major cities & towns

References

Villages in Kottayam district